Fanucci is an Italian surname. Notable people with the surname include:

Mike Fanucci (born 1949), American football player
Stefano Fanucci (born 1979), Italian footballer

Fictional characters
Don Fanucci, a character in The Godfather

Italian-language surnames